Lucien Teisseire (December 11, 1919 – December 22, 2007) was a French professional road bicycle racer. He was born in Saint-Laurent-du-Var, Alpes-Maritimes. He is most known for his bronze medal in the 1948 UCI Road World Championships. He finished second in the 1945 Paris–Roubaix.

Major results

1942
Circuit des villes d'eaux d'Auvergne
1944
Paris–Tours
1947
GP de l'Echo d'Oran
Tour de France:
Winner stages 6 and 13
1948
GP du Pneumatique
Montluçon
Tour de France:
6th place overall classification
1949
Tour de France:
Winner stage 4
1951
GP de Cannes
1953
Mantes - La Baule
Critérium du Dauphiné Libéré
1954
Tour de France:
Winner stage 20

References

External links 

1919 births
2007 deaths
French male cyclists
French Tour de France stage winners
Sportspeople from Alpes-Maritimes
Cyclists from Provence-Alpes-Côte d'Azur